Cryptoptila australana, commonly known as the elderberry panax leaf roller, is a species of moth of the family Tortricidae. It is found in Australia, where it has been recorded from Queensland, New South Wales, the Australian Capital Territory and Victoria.

The wingspan is about 30 mm.  Adults have grey wings with rusty brown markings.

The larvae feed on elderberry panax (Polyscias sambucifolia), living in a communal shelter made of leaves joined with silk. They are dark brownish green with orange spots and white hairs. They reach a length of about 30 mm. Pupation takes place in the larval shelter.

References

	

Moths described in 1805
Archipini